An umm walad was the title given to a slave-concubine in the Muslim world after she had born her master a child. She could not be sold, and became automatically free on her master's death. The offspring of an umm walad were free and considered legitimate children of their father, including full rights of name and inheritance. 

The practice was a common way for slave girls endowed with beauty and intelligence to advance in the court, especially if they gave birth to sons; under the Caliphates, quite a few of them were raised in rank to queen. Few of them had been fortunate enough to be valide sultan (mother of the king).

Unacknowledged slave mother 
If an unmarried slave bore a child and the slave owner did not acknowledge parenthood, then the slave had to face zina charges.

Failure of economically maintaining female slave 
Islamic jurisprudence was complicated, if a male owner failed to provide economic maintenance to female slave or if the owner goes missing, then the situation of  female slave could get precarious if a local judge did not rule to free them.

See also
 Islamic sexual jurisprudence
 Islamic views on slavery
 Ma malakat aymanukum
 Mawla
 Mukataba
 Qiyan
 Hatun
 History of concubinage in the Muslim world
 Valide sultan

References

Sources
 

Islam and slavery
Islamic jurisprudence
Marriage in Islam